The Kellogg Creek Bridge spans Kellogg Creek in Milwaukie, Oregon, United States.

See also

 Kronberg Park

References

External links
 

Bridges in Clackamas County, Oregon
Milwaukie, Oregon